"The Mountain" is the first single off Three Days Grace's sixth studio album Outsider. The song peaked at number one on the Billboard Mainstream Rock chart in March 2018 and became Three Days Grace's 13th number one on the chart while tying the record with Van Halen. The song is featured in the NBA 2K19 soundtrack.

Background
In an interview with Digital Journal, bassist Brad Walst said "The Mountain" was originally written in September 2016 and about overcoming the daily difficulties in life. Three Days Grace's drummer Neil Sanderson similarly told iHeartRadio that the song was about dealing with repetitive events that you have to complete and left without a choice.

The song was written by Neil Sanderson, Gavin Brown, Barry Stock, Brad Walst, Matt Walst and Johnny Andrews.

Recording
While talking with Detroit radio station WRIF, lead singer Matt Walst said he sang his highest ever during his musical career on "The Mountain". On the song's final chorus, Walst believed his voice reached a high D.

Release
"The Mountain" was released as the first single off Outsider on January 25, 2018 with an accompanying music video. In the music video, the band is singing in an Ultimate Fighting Championship ring with a guest appearance by Misha Cirkunov. The music video was directed by Sean Cartwright.

Reception
Digital Journal said "The Mountain" had "infectious riffs and strong hooks" alongside relevant and hopeful lyrics.

The band won the Rock Songwriters of the Year award for "The Mountain" on the 30th anniversary of the SOCAN Awards. The song also won the "No. 1 Song of the Year" award by SOCAN.

Personnel 
 Matt Walst – lead vocals
 Barry Stock – guitar
 Brad Walst – bass
 Neil Sanderson – drums, backing vocals, programming

Chart performance
In March 2018, "The Mountain" peaked at number one on the Billboard Mainstream Rock chart and became the 13th number-one song for Three Days Grace on the Billboard chart. With "The Mountain", Three Days Grace tied the record with Van Halen for the most number one songs on the Mainstream Rock chart.

Weekly charts

Year-end charts

Certifications

References

2018 singles
Three Days Grace songs
2018 songs
RCA Records singles
Songs written by Neil Sanderson
Songs written by Barry Stock
Songs written by Gavin Brown (musician)
Songs written by Johnny Andrews